Sayed Mustafa Kazemi (1959 – November 6, 2007) from Parwan was a prominent Afghan politician. He was one of the leaders and the spokesman for the opposition movement known as the United National Front. He was a former minister of commerce in the Afghan Transitional Government. Kazemi was amongst a delegation of politicians and lawmakers killed in a suicide bomb attack in Baghlan, northern Afghanistan, on November 6, 2007.

See also 
 2007 Baghlan sugar factory bombing

References

External links 
 Mustafa Kazemi and hundreds of children Sacrificed by Fascism

Hazara politicians
Assassinated Afghan politicians
Trade ministers of Afghanistan
People from Parwan Province
1959 births
2007 deaths
Terrorism deaths in Afghanistan
Afghan terrorism victims
Spokespersons
United National Front (Afghanistan) politicians